Lagochilin is a bitter diterpene that forms a grey crystalline solid. It is found in various plants from the genus Lagochilus, most notably Lagochilus inebrians, and is thought to be responsible for the sedative, hypotensive and hemostatic effects of this plant.

References 

Diterpenes
Primary alcohols
Cyclohexanols
Tetrahydrofurans
Spiro compounds